Dharifulhu is a 2000 Maldivian television film directed by Mohamed Shareef. Produced and distributed by Television Maldives, the film stars Ismail Rasheed, Ali Shameel, Aminath Rasheedha and Zuleykha Abdul Latheef in pivotal roles.

Premise
Due to his straightforward behavior, Saleem (Ali Shameel) is fired from his job which he lies to his wife Wafiyya (Aminath Rasheedha) as quitting the job for self-respect. When she inquires about his decision, frustrated Saleem divorces her. He takes custody of their only child, Nihan (Ismail Rasheed) and takes good care of him. He later marries his neighbor, Amira (Zuleykha Abdul Latheef) who acts like a mother-figure to Nihan until she delivers her first child. Nihan constantly being harassed by his step-mother becomes neglected by his own father too. Meanwhile, Amira conspires against Nihan which leads into his banishment from their island.

Cast 
 Ismail Rasheed as Nihan
 Ahmed Atheef as young Nihan
 Ali Shameel as Saleem
 Aminath Rasheedha as Wafiyya
 Zuleykha Abdul Latheef as Amira
 Ibrahim Shakir as Mohamed Ageel; Saleem's brother
 Chilhiya Moosa Manik as a teacher (Special appearance)
 Shameema as Ageel's wife (Special appearance)
 Ahmed Saeed as a representative (Special appearance)
 Moosa Zakariyya as a lawyer (Special appearance)
 Adam Manik
 Shahid
 Ali Nasih
 Abdullah Ziyad
 Mohamed Amir
 Anil

See also
 Lists of Maldivian films

References

2000 television films
2000 films
Maldivian television films